The Canon EOS 4000D is an 18.0 megapixels digital single-lens reflex camera (DSLR) made by Canon. It was announced on 25 February 2018 with a suggested retail price of €399 including an EF-S 18-55 f/3.5-5.6 III lens. It is also known as the EOS 3000D in some parts of the Asia Pacific region and the EOS Rebel T100 in North America.

The 4000D is an entry-level DSLR that has been optimized to sell at a low retail price. It replaces the EOS 1300D in the respect that it is the Canon DSLR with the lowest recommended retail price.

Features

 18.0 effective megapixel APS-C CMOS sensor
 9 AF points with 1 cross-type point in the center at f/5.6, extra sensitivity at f/2.8 or faster (except when an EF 28-80mm f/2.8-4L USM lens or EF 50mm f/2.5 Compact Macro lens is attached)
 ISO sensitivity 100 – 6400 (expandable to H: 12800)
 95% viewfinder frame coverage with 0.8× magnification
 1080p Full HD video recording at 24p, 25p (25 Hz) and 30p (29.97 Hz) with drop frame timing
 720p HD video recording at 60p (59.94 Hz) and 50p (50 Hz)
 3.0 frames per second continuous shooting
 2.7 inch (68.6 mm) 4:3 ratio colour TFT LCD screen
 Low-pass filter

Differences compared to the 1300D:

 Lower resolution of the screen: 2.7″ screen with 320 × 240 pixels (the resolution of the 1300D's display is about four times as high with 640 × 480 pixels at 3.0″)
 No NFC connectivity 
 Plastic lens mount (all other Canon DSLR cameras have a metal lens mount)

References

External links

Canon EOS 4000D Technische Daten (german)
Canon EOS 4000D / Rebel T100 Review

4000D
Live-preview digital cameras
Cameras introduced in 2018